Brigadier (Dr.) B. D. Mishra is a retired officer of the Indian Army, and presently Lieutenant governor of Ladakh. Previously he held the offices of Governor of Arunachal Pradesh and Governor of Meghalaya.

Career
Mishra retired from the Indian Army on 31 July 1995, after a career that began as a permanent regular infantry officer, on 17 December 1961. He was born on 20 July 1939.

Mishra was the commander of the NSG (Black Cat Commandos) Counter Hijack Task Force that assaulted the hijacked aircraft of Indian Airlines and successfully executed the rescue operation, at Raja Sansi Airfield, Amritsar, on 24 April 1993. All 124 travellers and crew members were rescued in the operation, after eliminating the hijackers, without any casualty or damage. Mishra received the Prime Minister's appreciation for his role in ending this hijack crisis.

Operational roles
Mishra has served in various wars and operational roles for India:

 Against Chinese attack on India (1962)
 Against Naga insurgents in Nagaland (1963–1964)
 Against Pakistan in Sialkot Sector (1965)
 Against Pakistan in Liberation of Bangladesh (1971)
 Against Pakistan on LoC in Poonch Sector, as Battalion Commander (1979-1981)
 Against LTTE as the Leading Brigade Commander of the Indian Peace Keeping Force in Jaffna, Vavunia and Trincomalee in Sri Lanka (1987-1988)
 Against J&K and Punjab terrorists, as NSG Force Commander (1990-1995)
 Volunteered for Kargil War, after retirement

He has received Commendation for Gallant Role in Counter Terrorist Operations.

Education

Mishra holds an MA from Allahabad University, an M.Sc from Madras University and a PhD from Jiwaji University, Gwalior. He has five years’ postgraduate and graduate level teaching experience in College of Combat at Mhow and in Defence Services Staff College at Wellington. He also holds an LL.B. degree from University of Delhi.

Military awards and decorations

References

External links
 Official Profile from Arunachal Pradesh government website

|-

|-

Governors of Arunachal Pradesh
Indian military personnel
University of Allahabad alumni
University of Madras alumni
1939 births
Living people
Jiwaji University alumni